Eduard Pesur (3 March 1905 Kohila Parish, Kreis Harrien – 1969) was an Estonian politician. He was a member of the III, IV and V Riigikogu. He was originally elected as a member of the Estonian Workers' Party, but during the III Riigikogu he switched to the Estonian Socialist Workers' Party, which he represented thereafter.

References

1905 births
1969 deaths
People from Kohila Parish
People from Kreis Harrien
Estonian Workers' Party politicians
Estonian Socialist Workers' Party politicians
Members of the Riigikogu, 1926–1929
Members of the Riigikogu, 1929–1932
Members of the Riigikogu, 1932–1934